Gilbert John Alldis (26 January 1920 – 1998) was a footballer who played as a wing half for Tranmere Rovers, New Brighton, Prescot Cables and Bangor City.

References

English footballers
Tranmere Rovers F.C. players
New Brighton A.F.C. players
Prescot Cables F.C. players
Bangor City F.C. players
1920 births
1998 deaths
Sportspeople from Birkenhead
Association football wing halves
English Football League players